Sphaerothylax is a genus of flowering plants belonging to the family Podostemaceae.

Its native range is Cameroon to Ethiopia and Southern Africa, Madagascar.

Species
Species:

Sphaerothylax abyssinica 
Sphaerothylax algiformis 
Sphaerothylax bemarivensis 
Sphaerothylax sphaerocarpa

References

Podostemaceae
Malpighiales genera